Crab Creek is a stream in the U.S. states of North Carolina and South Carolina. It is a tributary of the Little River.

Crab Creek derives its name from the crabapple trees lining its course.

See also
List of rivers of North Carolina
List of rivers of South Carolina

References

Rivers of Greenville County, South Carolina
Rivers of Henderson County, North Carolina
Rivers of Transylvania County, North Carolina
Rivers of North Carolina
Rivers of South Carolina